David Stone may refer to the following people:

 David B. Stone (1927–2010), American businessman
 David E. Stone (born 1947), American sound editor
 David Henry Stone (1812–1890), Lord Mayor of London in 1874
 David John Anthony Stone (born 1947), British Army officer and military historian
 David Lamme Stone Jr. (1876–1959), American Army officer
 David Lee Stone (born 1978), British fantasy author
 David R. Stone (born 1968), American military historian
 David Scott Stone, musician
 David Stone (cyclist) (born 1981), British cyclist
 David Stone (footballer) (born 1942), English footballer
 David Stone (keyboardist) (born 1952), keyboardist
 David Stone (magician) (born 1972), French magician
 David Stone (politician) (1770–1818), American politician, Governor of North Carolina and U.S. Senator
 David Stone (producer) (born 1966), American theatre and musical producer

See also
 Dave Stone, British television writer